Tetragonoderus leprieurii is a species of beetle in the family Carabidae. It was described by Gory in 1833.

References

leprieurii
Beetles described in 1833